Ready is the debut extended play by Australian singer-songwriter Ruel. It was released on 15 June 2018 through RCA Records.

Reception
Rob Moran from Sydney Morning Herald said the EP has "jazzy chords" and "lilting songs of troubled young love".

The Music Desk at Broadway World said "The 6-track EP... includes previously released standouts, "Younger", "Don't Tell Me", and "Dazed & Confused" ... [and] features two previously unreleased songs; an infectious falsetto-laden alt-R&B influenced track called "Not Thinkin' Bout You" and "Say", a nostalgic, heartfelt power-ballad that exquisitely showcases the young artist's impressive vocal range and control."

Ones to Watch said "The EP as a whole is a testament to the bright future of pop music, as it is rich with an array of genres, contains a diverse range of relatable lyrical themes, and hosts a number of guaranteed ear worms."

Atwood Magazine said "Ruel is Ready: He's proved it five times over on his introductory effort, asserting his musical and lyrical talents through a majestic series of heavy anthems and soulful ballads that cut deep, hitting home every time."

Track listing
Credits adapted from Tidal.Notes

  signifies a co-producer.
  signifies an miscellaneous producer.
 "Intro" features background vocals from Stella van Djik and Sylvie van Djik.
 "Younger" features background vocals from Hooked on Harmonx, Sarah Aarons, Thief and Jason McGee & The Choir.
 "Dazed & Confused" features background vocals from Phillipe-Marc Anquetil and Thief.
 "Not Thinkin' Bout You" features background vocals from Hooked on Harmonx and Phillipe-Marc Anquetil.
 "Say" features background vocals from Alex Hope, Angel Tairua, and Shhor.

Personnel 
Credits adapted from Tidal. 

Musicians
 Sarah Aarons – background vocals 
 E-Session Strings – strings 
 Beau Golden – keyboards 
 Hooked on Harmonx – background vocals 
 Alex Hope – background vocals , piano 
 Jason McGee and The Choir – choir 
 Sean Kantrowitz – guitar , synthesizer 
 Jake Meadows – harp 
 Taka Perry – piano 
 Shhor – background vocals 
 Angel Tairua – background vocals 
 Ruel Vincent van Djik – lead vocals 
 Stella van Djik – background vocals 
 Sylvie van Djik – background vocals 
 Thief – background vocals 
 Daniel Walsh – guitar 
Production
 Phillipe-Marc Anquetil – recording engineer 
 William Binderup – assistant engineer 
 Spencer Cheyne – mixing engineer 
 Eric J. Dubowsky – mixing engineer 
 Symbolyc One – co-producer 
 VohnBeatz – co-producer 
 Alex Hope – miscellaneous producer 
 Brennan Kennedy – assistant engineer 
 M-Phazes – producer , recording engineer 
 Erik Madrid – mixing engineer 
 Matt Noble – miscellaneous producer 
 One Above – recording engineer 
 Taka Perry – miscellaneous producer 
 Decap – miscellaneous producer 
 Keith "Ten4" Sorrells – mixing engineer

Weekly charts

Release history

References

2018 debut EPs
Ruel (singer) EPs